The New Zealand A cricket team toured India in September and October 2017. On this tour they played two first-class matches and five limited-overs matches against the India A team. New Zealand A was captained by Henry Nicholls. The two first-class matches were played at the ACA–KDCA Cricket Ground and the limited overs matches at ACA–VDCA Cricket Stadium in Visakhapatnam.

Squads

Parthiv Patel replaced Rishabh Pant for the second Test due to Pant's injury. Colin de Grandhomme replaced Sean Solia for the ODI series.

First-class series

1st unofficial Test

2nd unofficial Test

ODI Series

1st ODI

2nd ODI

3rd ODI

4th ODI

5th ODI

See also
 New Zealand cricket team in India in 2017–18

References

External links
 Series home at ESPN Cricinfo

2017 in Indian cricket
A team cricket